Red City Radio is an American punk rock band from Oklahoma City, Oklahoma, formed in 2007.  The band's lineup consists of Garrett Dale, Ryan Donovan, Jonathan Knight and Dallas Tidwell.

History
The band has released an EP, To the Sons and Daughters of Woody Guthrie, three full-length albums, The Dangers of Standing Still, Titles (on the Paper + Plastick label), and Red City Radio, as well as two split EPs and a digital single. In 2014, one of the band's lead singers, Paul Pendley, left the band and was replaced by Ryan Donovan, formerly in the Red Scare Industries punk band Nothington. Garrett Dale is now the band's only lead singer and songwriter. Red City Radio have toured in Europe, Russia, Canada as well as in the U.S.

Line-up
Garrett Dale - lead vocals, guitar (2007–present)
Ryan Donovan - guitar, backing vocals (2014–present)
Derik Envy - bass (2019–present)
Dallas Tidwell - drums, backing vocals (2007–present)

Previous members
Paul Pendley - guitar, lead and backing vocals (2007-2014)
Justin Porterfield - bass (2007-2009)
Jonathan Knight - bass, backing vocals (2009–2019)

Discography
 Midwestern Hymnal EP (split) (2007, The Independent Record Company)
 To the Sons and Daughters of Woody Guthrie EP (2009, The Independent Record Company) 
 split EP with The Great St. Louis (2010, All In Vinyl) 
 The Dangers of Standing Still (2011, Paper + Plastick) 
 split EP with The Gamits (2011, Paper + Plastick)
 Titles (2013, Paper + Plastick)
 Chronic Dookie EP (2015, Gunner Records)
 Red City Radio (2015, Staple Records) 
 SkyTigers EP (2018, Red Scare Industries)
 Paradise (2020, Pure Noise Records)

Videography
"We Are the Sons and Daughters of Woodie Guthrie"
"Two Notes Shy of an Octave"
"I'm Well You're Poison"
"Two Outta Three Ain't Rad"
"Punks in Vegas Sessions"

References

External links 
 Official Website
 
 Pure Noise Profile

2007 establishments in Oklahoma
21st-century American musicians
American punk rock groups
Culture of Oklahoma City
Musical groups established in 2007
Musical groups from Oklahoma